Golden Arrow (Italian: Freccia d'oro) is a 1935 Italian crime film directed by Piero Ballerini and Corrado D'Errico and starring Luisa Ferida, Guido Barbarisi and Ennio Cerlesi. It was screened at the 1935 Venice Film Festival.

It was shot at the Cines Studios in Rome. The film's sets were designed by Gastone Medin.

Cast
 Luisa Ferida as Evelyn - daughter of Sleiden  
 Guido Barbarisi as Weitzmuller - the jeweller
 Ennio Cerlesi as Conte Claudio Arden  
 Maurizio D'Ancora as Ted Wall  
 Emma Baron as Contessa Sonia Larman  
 Laura Nucci as Lilly Jorgen  
 Luigi Pavese as Ellis - the ambassador
 Augusto Marcacci as Sleiden - president of the Banca Generale  
 Enzo Gainotti as Mr. Morgan  
 Vanna Vanni as Dora Morgan  
 Giorgio Piamonti as first thief
 Bruno Smith as second thief  
 Giorgio Capecchi as train head waiter
 Nane Chaubert as foreign girl on the train
 Cesare Polacco as Casellante station master 
 Giovanni Bellini  as the engine driver
 Eva Magni as Maria - the engine driver's fiancée
 Adele Garavaglia as the engine driver's mother
 Mirella Giordani as the little girl
 Alfredo Menichelli as the little girl's father
 Mario Brizzolari
 Ernesto Calindri
 Dino Cardinali 
 Gustavo Conforti 
 Rocco D'Assunta 
 Giovanni Dal Cortivo 
 Doris Duranti 
 Eugenio Duse 
 Fernando Simbolotti 
 Vittorio Tettoni

References

Bibliography

External links 
 

1935 crime drama films
Italian crime drama films
1935 films
1930s Italian-language films
Films directed by Corrado D'Errico
Films directed by Piero Ballerini
Italian black-and-white films
Cines Studios films
1930s Italian films